The 2012–13 FC Anzhi Makhachkala season was the 3rd successive season that the club played in the Russian Premier League, the highest tier of football in Russia. Anzhi Makhachkala finished the season in Third place, qualifying for the 2013–14 UEFA Europa League Group stage, whilst they also where Runners Up to CSKA Moscow in the Russian Cup and reached the Round of 16 of the 2012–13 UEFA Europa League where they were knocked out by Newcastle United.

Season events
Anzhi Makhachkala's away game against Zenit St. Petersburg on 10 December was played behind closed doors.

Anzhi Makhachkala's home UEFA Europa League knockout phase games where played at the Luzhniki Stadium in Moscow instead of their regular Dynamo Stadium in Makhachkala, due to security issues involving the city of Makhachkala and the autonomous republic of Dagestan.

Squad

On loan

Transfers

In

Loans in

Out

Loans out

Released

Friendlies

Competitions

Premier League

Results summary

Results by round

Results

League table

Russian Cup

UEFA Europa League

Qualifying phase

Group stage

Knockout phase

Squad statistics

Appearances and goals

|-
|colspan="14"|Players away from the club on loan:

|-
|colspan="14"|Players who appeared for Anzhi Makhachkala no longer at the club:

|}

Goal scorers

Clean Sheets

Disciplinary record

Awards

Player of the Month

References

FC Anzhi Makhachkala seasons
Anzhi Makhachkala
Anzhi Makhachkala